Kunshan railway station is a railway station of Jinghu railway. The station is located Kunshan, Suzhou, Jiangsu, China. The station opened in 1905.

Railway stations in Jiangsu
Railway stations in China opened in 1905
Railway stations in Suzhou
Stations on the Beijing–Shanghai Railway